Onychiuroidea is a superfamily of springtails in the order Poduromorpha. There are about 5 families and more than 630 described species in Onychiuroidea.

Families
These five families belong to the superfamily Onychiuroidea, according to Checklist of the Collembola of the World. The families Isotogastruridae, Odontellidae, and Pachytullbergiidae are sometimes listed as members of other superfamilies.
 Isotogastruridae Thibaud & Najt, 1992
 Odontellidae Massoud, 1967
 Onychiuridae Lubbock, 1913
 Pachytullbergiidae Stach, 1954
 Tullbergiidae Bagnall, 1935

References

Further reading

External links

 

Poduromorpha
Arthropod superfamilies